Madhuri is an Indian Marathi language film, presented by Urmila Matondkar in association with Shekhar Mate directed by Swapna Waghmare Joshi and produced by Mohsin Akhtar under the banner of Mumbapuri Films. The film is scheduled to be released on 30 November 2018. A theatrical poster was released on 19 October 2018.

Cast
Sonali Kulkarni
Sharad Kelkar
Sanhita Joshi
Akshay Kelkar
Virajas Kulkarni

Plot

In a beautiful sleepy town of Panchgani lives a strict, principled professor with her equally rebellious and difficult daughter.

In a quirky twist of fate, the professor meets with an accident and her memory travels back to the age of twenty. What follows is the total role reversal for the daughter, who does not know how to handle the situation. The only saving grace here is the psychiatrist who is treating her mother.

On coming abreast with a completely different side of the mother's personality, she sets on a journey to find out about her mother's past. Will she be able to mend the troubled relationship she had with her mother? Will the psychiatrist be able to revive back the professor's memory?

Music

References

External links
Madhuri on Book my show
Madhuri Movie Review

2010s Marathi-language films
2010s Hindi-language films
Films directed by Swapna Waghmare Joshi